Çərəkən is a village in the Jabrayil District of Azerbaijan. It's been uninhabited since the forced exodus of its Azerbaijani population during the First Nagorno-Karabakh war.

References 

Populated places in Jabrayil District